Maryam Apaokagi, known professionally as Taaooma, is a Nigerian comedian, content creator, cinematographer, and social media influencer. She currently serves as the CEO, and founder of Chop Tao, a food company, and directs for The Greenade Company, a cinematography firm. She is known for playing multiple roles in her skits.

Early life
Maryam Apaokagi was born February 28 1999,in her hometown of Ilorin Kwara State,but she spent most of her early years in Namibia. She studied Tourism and Travel Service Management at the Kwara State University. In 2022, she tells The Punch, “I wanted to be a doctor. Later, I changed it to a lawyer. I got to university and was offered Tourism.”

In 2015, she started online comedy after convincing her fiancé to teach her the basics of video editing. She rose to stardom in 2019 with a skit based on African parents taking their children to school. In 2019, she was the face of Media Room Hub’s July Issue. Her comedy skits are centered on exposing African mothers and their unique manner of disciplining African children with a slap.

Personal life 
In October 2020, Apaokagi engaged her fiancé Abdulaziz Oladimeji (aka. Abula) in Namibia, and got married on 24 January 2021.

Awards and recognitions

See also 
 List of Nigerian comedians
 De General

References

Nigerian women comedians
1999 births
Kwara State University alumni
Living people